The year 1567 in science and technology included a number of events, some of which are listed here.

Astronomy
 Jean-Antoine de Baïf publishes Le Premier des Météores, a didactic poem on astronomy, in France.

Mathematics
 Fabrizio Mordente (1532 – ca 1608) publishes a single sheet treatise in Venice showing illustrations of his "proportional eight-pointed compass" which has two arms with cursors that allow the solution of problems in measuring the circumference, area and angles of a circle.

Medicine
 Paracelsus publishes On the Miners' Sickness and Other Diseases of Miners, a pioneering example of occupational medicine.

Births
 John Parkinson, English herbalist and botanist (died 1650)

Deaths
 April 19 - Michael Stifel, German mathematician (born c. 1487)

References

 
16th century in science
1560s in science